Nice View is a 2022 Chinese comedy-drama film directed by Wen Muye. It is Wen's second feature film. It mainly tells the story of a young man named Jing Hao who, in order to save his sister, desperately seizes the opportunity he found to start a business, changes his fate, and affects the people around him. The film was completed in October 2021 and was released in mainland China on February 1, 2022 (the first day of the Chinese New Year). The film made over $211 million, making it the ninth highest-grossing film of 2022. China submitted Nice View for Best International Feature Film category of the Academy Awards.

Synopsis 
20-year-old Jing Hao came to Shenzhen to live with his young sister alone. The siblings live a warm yet straitened life. In an effort to pay for his sister's expensive surgery, Jing Hao gets an opportunity by chance, thinking that a better life is coming, but unexpectedly encounters a serious setback. Under the pressure of both time and money, Jing Hao, who has no way out, decides to take a desperate gamble. Can this ignite the spark of hope for his troubled ordinary life?

Cast 
 Jackson Yee as Jing Hao
 Tian Yu as Liang Yongcheng
 Chen Halin as Jing Tong, Jing Hao's younger sister
 Qi Xi as Wang Chunmei
 Gong Lei as Zhang Longhao
 Xu Juncong as Zhang Chao
 Wang Ning as Liu Hengzhi
 Huang Yao as Wu Xiaoli
 Gong Jinguo as Zhong Wei

Production 
On 5 August 2021, it was revealed Jackson Yee would be the lead in Wen Muye's second feature film. The director's first film is Dying to Survive. Filmed in Shenzhen and across summer and autumn, the crew and cast had endured two resurgences of the COVID-19 and four typhoons. Despite there was adequate natural rainfall, artificial rain was used, so they can control it according to their requirement and vision. Filming wrapped on 8 October 2021.

Music

Reception 
Nice View has become a holiday favorite among those in the Chinese film industry, who have rallied the headlines on social media. The film rose from fifth to third during its opening weekend, grossing $104.4 million.

Some critics praised the film as "one of the best homegrown productions in recent years that focuses on the dreams, endeavors and touching emotions of ordinary people against a massive historical backdrop." With its "sophisticated techniques and compelling [plot]", it provides experience for similar films to be made in the future. This film "also pays tribute to ordinary people who have contributed to the country's remarkable progress and development over the past few decades."

Notes

References

External links 
 
 
 

Chinese drama films
Chinese comedy films
Chinese comedy-drama films
2022 drama films
2022 comedy films
2022 comedy-drama films
2022 films
Films set in Shenzhen
IMAX films
Chinese New Year films